Yulton Lake, situated 4 km east of Cay Volcano and 15 km east of Maca Volcano, is a volcano-dammed lake in Aysén del General Carlos Ibáñez del Campo Region, Chile.

References

Lakes of Chile
Lakes of Aysén Region